Paracobitis zabgawraensis is a species of stone loach found in the Great Zab River in Iraqi Kurdistan and Habour in Turkey.

References

zabgawraensis
Fish of Asia
Fish of Afghanistan
Taxa named by Jörg Freyhof
Taxa named by Hamid Reza Esmaeili
Taxa named by Golnaz Sayyadzadeh
Taxa named by Matthias F. Geiger
Fish described in 2014